Thomas Paul White (30 April 1915 – 27 September 1993) was a Canadian speed skater. He competed in four events at the 1936 Winter Olympics.

References

1915 births
1993 deaths
Canadian male speed skaters
Olympic speed skaters of Canada
Speed skaters at the 1936 Winter Olympics
Place of birth missing
20th-century Canadian people